Ideratini is a tribe of beetles in the subfamily Cerambycinae, containing the single genus Ideratus and the following species:

 Ideratus beatus Martins, Galileo & Oliveira, 2011
 Ideratus cyanipennis (Thomson, 1864)
 Ideratus nactus (Lane, 1970)
 Ideratus sagdus (Monné & Martins, 1972)
 Ideratus virginiae (Dalens & Tavakilian, 2006)

References

Cerambycinae